This is a list of chicken breeds usually considered to be of German origin. Some may have complex or obscure histories, so inclusion here does not necessarily imply that a breed is predominantly or exclusively from Germany.

References

Chicken